Dropgun is a Russian DJ and production duo from Tomsk, formed in 2013.

The group is best known for their collaboration with Dvbbs in the single "Pyramids" in 2014. The single reached 39th place on the Belgian charts.

Discography

Charting singles

Other singles 
Only singles and remixes released since October 2012 are listed below:

 2014: Shout
 2014: Hayao (with Ralvero) [DOORN (Spinnin')]
 2014: Amsterdam [Oxygen (Spinnin')]
 2014: Angst [Metanoia Music (Arisa Audio)]
 2014: Pyramids (with DVBBS) [Spinnin' Records]
 2015: Cobra (with Tony Junior) [DOORN (Spinnin')]
 2015: Ninja [Skink (Spinnin')]
 2015: Together As One [Flamingo]
 2016: Chronos (with Jaggs) [Revealed]
 2016: One World (with Swanky Tunes) [Armada Music]
 2016: Fever (with Farleon) [HEXAGON (Spinnin')]
 2016: Nobody [HEXAGON (Spinnin')]
 2016: A Better Love (with Lenx & Denx) [Flamingo]
 2016: Atlantis (with Breathe Carolina) [Spinnin' Premium]
 2017: Rhythm Is A Dancer (with Breathe Carolina) [Spinnin' Records]
 2017: All I Want (with XORR) [Flamingo]
 2017: Little Drop [Spinnin' Premium]
 2017: Nothing New [HEXAGON (Spinnin')]
 2017: Really Mine (with Natan Chaim) [Thrive]
 2018: My Way (with Asketa) [Enhanced]
 2018: Krishna [Dharma (Spinnin')]
 2018: Dark Sky [HEXAGON (Spinnin')]
 2018: Next To Me (with Aspyer) [Musical Freedom (Spinnin')]
 2018: Sweet Dreams (with Breathe Carolina) [Spinnin' Records]
 2018: Uluwatu (with Jesse Wilde) [Dharma (Spinnin')]
 2018: Somebody [Spinnin' Copyright Free]
 2018: Island (with Asketa) [Thrive Music]
 2018: Fire Blazing [Spinnin' Copyright Free]
 2018: Earthquake [Spinnin' Records]
 2018: Tomorrow Never Comes [Future House Music]
 2018: Drought [Hexagon (Spinnin')]
 2019: Spirit Of Freedom [Spinnin' Premium]
 2019: I'm On My Way (with Sebastian Wibe) [Hexagon]
 2019: A Little More Like You [Dharma (Spinnin')]
 2019: Same Things (with Røguenethvn and Pillows) [CYB3RPVNK]
 2019: Falling (with Asketa & Natan Chaim) [Hexagon]
 2019: Darkside (with Do It Big and Arikakito) [Dharma (Spinnin')]
 2020: Sanctuary (with Bassrox) [Dharma (Spinnin')]
 2020: Confession [Generation Hex (Hexagon)]
 2020: Annihilation [Prophecy (Hexagon)]
 2020: Chicken Run [Prophecy (Hexagon)]
 2020: Tantsui [Prophecy (Hexagon)]
 2020: Control [Prophecy (Hexagon)]
 2020: Bai Bai Bai (featuring Dimma Urih) [Prophecy (Hexagon)]
 2020: H2S04 [Heldeep]
 2020: U&I (with Christopher Damas) [Hexagon]
 2020: Burnt Tires" (featuring Dimma Urih) [Hexagon]
 2020: Promises (with Breathe Carolina featuring Reigns) [Spinnin']
 2021: Fisher (featuring Dimma Urih) [Hexagon]
 2021: Open Up Your Mind (featuring Boba Sheshera and Kíki) [Doorn Records]
 2021: Stay (with Boba Sheshera) [Hexagon]

 Remixes 
 2014: Major Lazer — Aerosol Can (Dropgun Bootleg)
 2017: Pegboard Nerds & Spyker — Extraordinary (Dropgun Remix)
 2017: Taku-Hero & Funk Machine — Fun Lovin' (Dropgun Remix) [Revealed Recordings]
 2017: Breathe Carolina — This Again (Dropgun and Taku-Hero Remix) [Spinnin' Remixes]
 2017: Brklyn — I'm On Somethin (Dropgun Remix) [Enhanced Music]
 2017: Galantis & Throttle — Tell Me You Love Me (Dropgun Remix) [Big Beat]
 2018: Gryffin — Winnebago (Dropgun Remix) [Darkroom (Geffen)]
 2019: Grey — Want You Back (Dropgun Remix) [Island]
 2019: Superspecial — Heroes (Dropgun Remix) [Desirmont]
 2019: Funk Machine & Taku-Hero — Something (Dropgun Remix) [Revealed Recordings]
 2019: Armin van Buuren — Turn It Up (Dropgun Remix) [Armind (Armada)]
 2019: Funk Machine & Taku-Hero — It Ain't Over (Dropgun Remix) [Revealed Recordings] 

 Prophecy recordings discography 

In March 2020, Dropgun launched their own record label - Prophecy - as a sublabel of Don Diablo's Hexagon label, as part of the label's expansion, which also included the launch of sublabels run by King Arthur, RetroVision and JLV.

 2020: Dropgun - Annihilation
 2020: Savage Kids & Lørean - Dark Side
 2020: Dropgun - Chicken Run
 2020: Gosha - Get Busy
 2020: Dropgun - Tantsui
 2020: Vedde - Best Bud
 2020: Dropgun - Control
 2020: Lakros - Quadra
 2020: Dropgun feat. Dimma Urih - Bai Bai Bai
 2020: Noiz Van Grane - Re-Education
 2020: Colourveins & Evernone - Tell Me
 2020: Dropgun feat. Dimma Urih - Burnt Tires
 2020: CØDE - Get A Taste
 2020: Lakros - Cyberland

References
Notes
 A''' Did not enter the Ultratop 50, but peaked on the Walloon Ultratip chart.

Sources

External links
Official website

Russian DJs
Russian house musicians
Electronic music duos
House musicians
Electronic dance music DJs